Aslam Farrukhi (23 October 1923 – 15 June 2016) was an Urdu author, literary critic, linguist, scholar, and radio scriptwriter from Pakistan. He is also known for writing children's books. He remained associated as a professor and chairman with the Department of Urdu, University of Karachi, for many years.

Early life
Aslam Farrukhi was born on 23 October 1923 into a literary family of Lucknow, British India. His ancestors had come to Lucknow from the nearby town Farrukhabad, hence the family name being used here is Farrukhi. After the independence of Pakistan in 1947, he migrated with his family to Karachi, Pakistan in September 1947.

He completed his education from the then Federal Urdu College, now known as Federal Urdu University and the University of Karachi. His PhD degree thesis was on the 19th century writer Muhammad Husain Azad which won the Adamjee Literary Award in 1965.

Career
He started out his career at Radio Pakistan as a scriptwriter for radio plays. Later Aslam Farrukhi taught at Sindh Muslim College, now known as Sindh Madressatul Islam University  and at Karachi University, where he also served as registrar. His son is scholar Asif Farrukhi who also was a co-founder of Karachi Literature Festival. He was associated as professor and retired as chairman with the Department of Urdu, University of Karachi, for many years, and with Radio Pakistan for more than six years. He was among the country's few writers of children's literature.

Awards and recognition
 Pride of Performance Award by the President of Pakistan in 2009.
 Adamjee Literary Award in 1965

Death 
Aslam Farrukhi died on June 15, 2016 in Gulshan e Iqbal, Karachi and was buried in Karachi University Graveyard on June 16, 2016 after Zohar Prayer. Among the survivors are his wife and two sons.

Bibliography
  Muhammad Hussain Azad: Hayat-o-Tasaneef - Life and Writings of the 19th century author Muhammad Husain Azad
 Guldasta-e-Ahbab
 Aangann main Sitaray
 Farid-o-Fard-i-Fareed - a book on the life of 13th century Sufi Baba Fariduddin Ganjshakar
 Dabistan-e-Nizam (Publisher:Pakistan Writers Cooperative Society)
 Bachon Ke Sultanjee - a book on the works of 13th century Sufi Khwaja Nizamuddin Auliya who were also lovingly nicknamed 'Sultanjee'
 Bachon ke Ranga Rung Amir Khusraw
 Urdu Ki Pehli Kitab for children
 Mausam-i-Bahar Jaisay Log
 Saat Asman
 Lal, Sabz Kabootar
 Raunaq-i-Bazm-i-Jahan

See also
 List of Pakistani poets
 List of Pakistani writers

References

External links
  Aslam Farrukhi honoured - Daily Dawn
  Aslam Farrukhi Rare Picture 
  Urdu Bandhan

1923 births
2016 deaths
Writers from Lucknow
Muhajir people
Urdu-language poets from Pakistan
Pakistani children's writers
Pakistani literary critics
Linguists from Pakistan
Linguists of Urdu
Pakistani scholars
Pakistani educators
Urdu-language writers
Urdu critics
Recipients of the Pride of Performance
Academic staff of the University of Karachi
Writers from Karachi
Urdu-language children's writers
20th-century Pakistani poets
Academics from Karachi